Postmodern American Poetry is a poetry anthology edited by Paul Hoover and published by W. W. Norton & Company in 1994. A substantially revised second edition in 2012 removed some poets and added many others, incorporating additional American poetry movements which came to prominence in the 21st century.

The introduction identifies the use of postmodern with its early mention by Charles Olson, and identifies the field chosen as experimental poetry from after 1945. The book contains, besides poems, about 20 short essays on poetics.

The first edition joined two other collections which appeared at that time: From the Other Side of the Century: "A New American Poetry, 1960-1990" (1994; edited by Douglas Messerli) and American Poetry Since 1950 (1993; edited by Eliot Weinberger).

The anthology, the goal of which is to "fully represent the movements of American avant-garde poetry", includes representatives from the Beat and New York School poets, the Projectivists, "deep image" poets, language and performance poetry, and various experimentalists. The second edition adds works associated with Newlipo, conceptual poetry, and cyberpoetry/Flarf.

The 1994 edition consists of 411 poems by 103 poets and essays by 18 authors, including some of the poets who also have poetry in the book.

Poets in  American Poetry (1994 edition)

(poets arranged in chronological order by birth year)

 Charles Olson
 John Cage
 James Laughlin
 Robert Duncan
 Lawrence Ferlinghetti
 Hilda Morley
 Charles Bukowski
 Barbara Guest
 Jackson Mac Low
 Jack Kerouac
 Philip Whalen
 Denise Levertov
 James Schuyler
 Jack Spicer
 Kenneth Koch
 Frank O'Hara
 Allen Ginsberg
 Robert Creeley
 Paul Blackburn
 Larry Eigner
 John Ashbery
 Hannah Weiner
 Kenward Elmslie
 Ed Dorn
 Harry Mathews
 Gregory Corso

 Gary Snyder
 Jerome Rothenberg
 David Antin
 Keith Waldrop
 Michael McClure
 Amiri Baraka
 Diane Di Prima
 Ted Berrigan
 Anselm Hollo
 Joseph Ceravolo
 John Wieners
 Robert Kelly
 Clayton Eshleman
 Rosmarie Waldrop
 Gustaf Sobin
 Russell Edson
 John Giorno
 Jayne Cortez
 Clarence Major
 Diane Wakoski
 Susan Howe
 Kathleen Fraser
 Tony Towle
 Bill Berkson
 Ed Sanders
 Clark Coolidge

 Stephen Rodefer
 Robert Grenier
 Lyn Hejinian
 Miguel Algarín
 Tom Clark
 Charles North
 Ron Padgett
 Ann Lauterbach
 William Corbett
 Tom Mandel
 Michael Palmer
 Ray DiPalma
 Maureen Owen
 Paul Violi
 Michael Davidson
 Marjorie Welish
 Lorenzo Thomas
 Anne Waldman
 Alice Notley
 Bernadette Mayer
 John Godfrey
 Wanda Coleman
 Andrei Codrescu
 Paul Hoover
 Berwyn Moore
 Ron Silliman

 Bob Perelman
 Nathaniel Mackey
 David Shapiro
 Rae Armantrout
 Mei-mei Berssenbrugge
 Leslie Scalapino
 Bruce Andrews
 Barrett Watten
 David Lehman
 George Evans
 August Kleinzahler
 Eileen Myles
 Victor Hernandez Cruz
 Jessica Hagedorn
 Charles Bernstein
 John Yau
 Jim Carroll
 Carla Harryman
 Maxine Chernoff
 Art Lange
 Jimmy Santiago Baca
 David Trinidad
 Elaine Equi
 Dennis Cooper
 Amy Gerstler
 Diane Ward
 Michael Giardina

Authors of essays on poetics in the volume (1994 edition)

 Charles Olson
 John Cage
 Robert Duncan
 Denise Levertov
 Frank O'Hara

 Allen Ginsberg
 Robert Creeley
 Jerome Rothenberg
 Amiri Baraka
 Susan Howe

 Clark Coolidge
 Lyn Hejinian
 Bernadette Mayer
 Ron Silliman

 Nathaniel Mackey
 Bruce Andrews
 Victor Hernandez Cruz
 Charles Bernstein

Other information
 (paperback)

See also
 1994 in poetry
 Postmodern literature

References

External links
Whose New American Poetry?: Anthologizing in the Nineties
Experimentations in Abstract Postmodern Poetry

1994 poetry books
American poetry anthologies
Works about postmodernism
W. W. Norton & Company books